Rhapsody of Spring is a 1998 Chinese drama film directed and co-written by Teng Wenji, based on the life of composer Shi Guangnan (1940–1990). Although the protagonist's name has been changed to "Zhao Liming" to accommodate the dramatized plot, most of the songs featured in the film are unmistakably composed by Shi.

Awards and nominations
1999 Beijing College Student Film Festival
 Won — Best Director (Teng Wenji)
1999 Golden Rooster Awards
 Won — Best Supporting Actress (Yuan Quan)
 Nominated — Best Film
 Nominated — Best Director (Teng Wenji)

External links

1998 films
Chinese drama films
Films set in Beijing
Films set in Xinjiang
Films set in Shaanxi